Jagannath Barooah College (popularly known as J.B. College) is an autonomous college located in Jorhat, Assam, India. It was founded on 19 August 1930. The College is affiliated to Dibrugarh University and recognized by University Grants Commission (UGC). It was accredited by National Assessment and Accreditation Council (NAAC), India in 2003.

History
It was named Upper Assam College at first and later Jorhat College on 4 September 1930. On 25 June 1938, during a meeting under the then president, Chandradhar Barooah, it was renamed to the present Jagannath Barooah College in recognition of the commodious building 'Borpatra Kutir' along with the previous land owner, Murulidhar Barooah. Murulidhar Barooah had inherited this property from his grandfather Jagannath Barooah, who was the first graduate of Upper Assam in 1872 from Presidency College, Calcutta. The founder principal of this institution was Prof. Krishna Kanta Handique. The other dedicated founder teachers were Prof. Tulsi Narayan Sharma (Founder Secretary), Jagneswar Sarma, Phanidhar Dutta, Prafulla Pran Changkakati and Gunagobinda Dutta.

Departments
  Assamese
  Bengali
 Bio-Technology
 Botany
 Chemistry
 Commerce
 Computer Science
 Economics
 Electronics
  English
 Geography
 Geology
 Hindi
 History
 Mathematics
 Philosophy
 Physics
 Political Science
 Sanskrit
 Sociology
 Statistics
 Zoology

Courses
The college offers Higher Secondary, Under Graduate and Post Graduate courses.

 Higher Secondary Programme
 Arts
 Science
 Commerce

 Bachelor Programme
 Bachelor of Computer Application (BCA)
 Bachelor of Arts (B.A)
 Bachelor of Commerce (B.COM)
 Bachelor of Science (B.Sc.)

 Master Programme
 Post-graduate courses in Geography, Philosophy, Assamese, Commerce and Political Science
 Post-graduate courses under Distance Education Scheme of Dibrugarh University in following subjects: Assamese, Commerce, Economics, History, Mathematics and Political Science & Sociology.
 Post-graduate Diploma course in Computer Application., (PGDCA).

Notable alumni
The notable alumni of J.B. College are
 Bijoy Krishna Handique, Former Union Minister (MP).
 Sheela Borthakur, Social worker and Padma Shri awardee
 Tarun Gogoi, former Chief Minister of Assam.
 Zubeen Garg, Singer, Composer, Filmmaker, Director and Actor
Jayanta Nath, Singer, Composer, Film director.
Manas Robin, Singer, Composer.

Library
The college has a well-stocked library, named as Krishnakanta Handiqui Central Library, with a good variety and range of collections. Currently, it houses around 53,000+ books, 3104 back volume and about 151 CD/DVDs. National and international journals and magazines  in Assamese, Hindi and English languages and subscribes 15 national and local dailies. Moreover, it has a good collection of encyclopedias relating to different subjects. 
 Library Automation Software - Koha ILMS
 Web OPAC
 Library Hours - Monday to Saturday 09:00 AM – 04:30 PM

College magazine
The College publishes an annual magazine the "JBIAN" and the first issue of the magazine was published in 1939. The annual magazine is also published online in digital format.

References

External links

Universities and colleges in Assam
Jorhat
Jorhat district
Education in Jorhat district
Colleges affiliated to Dibrugarh University
1930 establishments in India
Educational institutions established in 1930